Sunrise State Park (originally Sunrise Resort State Park) is a public recreation area occupying the site of the former Sunrise Resort in the town of East Haddam, Connecticut. The state park encompasses  on the east shore of Salmon River and shares an entrance with Machimoodus State Park to the south. The park is managed by the Connecticut Department of Energy and Environmental Protection.

History
The property came to life as Ted Hilton's Vacation Hide-A-Way in 1916, before becoming the Frank Davis Resort, and finally Sunrise Resort, when  the property was purchased by the state in 2009 for $3.2 million. At that time, the state planned to maintain the resort as a meeting place with camping and other recreational facilities in place. After failing to find redevelopers, the Department of Energy and Environmental Protection demolished more than 80 dilapidated resort buildings in 2013, allowing the land to return to its natural state. As of July 2020, some abandoned buildings remain standing, but are closed to the public.

Activities and amenities
The park offers hiking trails and concessionaire kayak rentals added to the site in 2016.

References

External links

Sunrise State Park Connecticut Department of Energy and Environmental Protection
Sunrise State Park Map Connecticut Department of Energy and Environmental Protection

State parks of Connecticut
Parks in Middlesex County, Connecticut
Protected areas established in 2009
2009 establishments in Connecticut
East Haddam, Connecticut